Crow Mother is a progressive rock band from Riga (Latvia) that was formed in 2012. With five members, in 2012 the band won the chance to perform at the Red Bull Tourbus (a competition for new bands) and in 2013, won "Best Rock Band" at the LMT Summer Sound Festival.
Crow Mother first album Changes that was released in December 2013. In the beginning of 2014 upon releasing its debut album Changes the band went on short tour to London, UK, giving album presentation concerts in 12 Bar Club,Alley Cat Bar,The Dublin Castle pub and Cargo club. In the end of 2014 band released single " Gray Wolf " from the upcoming new studio album.

After a short time, the band released second single "Demons" and in 2016 took part in the TV show Supernova which was also the national selection round for the Eurovision Song Contest in Latvia.

The latest single from Crow Mother is the song "Dirty Van", which was released in August 2016, signaling that the arrival of the second album is near. Dirty Van provides insight on the various adventures of the band while being on the road touring Poland. Neverending highways, broken down car, new friends and long way back home - it's all packed in one lyrical song.

In May 2017, Crow Mother finally released their second studio album The Moment Of Truth. This album includes 11 songs that were recorded during the last 3 years while band members were challenging their creative goals. The Moment Of Truth offers a bit eclectic mix as you can hear and feel different styles colliding throughout the album providing memories from the bands beginnings and giving some insight in modern influences.

Members
 Edijs Jurēvics
 Jānis Andžāns
 Edgars Briedis
 Mārtiņš Vilšķērsts

Discography

Albums
 The Moment Of Truth (2017)
 Changes (2013)

Singles
 Dirty Van (2016)
 Demons (2016)
 Gray Wolf (2014)
 Winterland (2012)
 White Devil (2013)
 Smile Like You Care (2013)
 Killing the Love (2013)
 Sugar, Blood & Wine (2013)

Festivals
Latvian "Summer Sound festival" (2013)
Polish "UBC CHARLOTTA ROCK FESTIVAL" (2015) KLANG!(2015)

References

External links
 

Latvian rock music groups
Musical groups established in 2012
2012 establishments in Latvia